(commonly referred to as Sonic '06) is a 2006 platform game developed by Sonic Team and published by Sega. It was produced in commemoration of the Sonic series' 15th anniversary, and intended as a reboot for the seventh-generation video game consoles. Players control Sonic, Shadow, and the new character Silver, who battle Solaris, an ancient evil pursued by Doctor Eggman. Each playable character has his own campaign and abilities, and must complete levels, explore hub worlds and fight bosses to advance the story. In multiplayer modes, players can work cooperatively to collect Chaos Emeralds or race to the end of a level.

Development began in 2004, led by Sonic co-creator Yuji Naka. Sonic Team sought to create an appealing game in the vein of superhero films such as Batman Begins, hoping it would advance the series with a realistic tone and multiple gameplay styles. Problems developed after Naka resigned to form his own company, Prope, and the team split to work on the Wii game Sonic and the Secret Rings (2007). As a result, Sonic the Hedgehog was rushed for release in time for the December holiday season. It was released for Xbox 360 in November 2006 and for PlayStation 3 the following month. Versions for Wii and Windows were canceled. Downloadable content featuring new single-player modes was released in 2007.

Sonic the Hedgehog received praise in prerelease showings, as journalists believed it could return the series to its roots after years of mixed reviews. However, it was a critical failure. Reviewers criticized its loading times, camera system, story, voice acting, glitches, and controls. It is widely considered the worst Sonic game and led to the series' direction being rethought; subsequent games ignored its tone and most characters. In 2010, Sega delisted Sonic the Hedgehog from retailers, following its decision to remove all Sonic games with below-average Metacritic scores to increase the value of the franchise.

Gameplay

Sonic the Hedgehog is a 3D platformer with action-adventure and role-playing elements. Like Sonic Adventure, the single player navigates through open-ended hub worlds where they can converse with townspeople and perform missions to advance the story. The main gameplay takes place in linear levels that become accessible as the game progresses. The main playable characters are three hedgehogs: Sonic, Shadow, and Silver, who feature in separate campaigns titled "episodes". A bonus "Last Episode", which involves all three hedgehogs and concludes the storyline, is unlocked upon completing the first three.

Sonic's story focuses on the speed-based platforming seen in previous Sonic games, with some sections having him run at full speed while dodging obstacles or riding a snowboard. Another character, Princess Elise, must be escorted in some stages, and she can use a special barrier to guard Sonic. Shadow's sections are similarly speedy, albeit more combat-oriented, with some segments having him ride vehicles. In contrast, Silver's levels are slower and revolve around his use of telekinesis to defeat enemies and solve puzzles. In certain areas, control is switched to one of several friend characters, with their own abilities.

Although each character traverses the same levels, their unique abilities allow the player to access different areas of each stage and prevent them from accessing certain items. Scattered through each level are golden rings, which serve as a form of health. The rings can protect a character from a single hit by an enemy or obstacle, at which point they will be scattered and blink before disappearing. The game begins with Sonic, Shadow, and Silver each assigned a limited number of lives. These lives are successively lost whenever, with no rings in their possession, the characters are hit by an enemy or obstacle or encounter other fatal hazards. The game ends when the player exhausts the characters' lives. Every few levels, players will encounter a boss stage; to proceed, they must defeat the boss by depleting its health meter.

Upon completion of a level or mission, players are given a grade depending on their performance, with an "S" rank being the best and a "D" rank being the worst. Players are given money for completing missions; more money is given to higher ranks. This money can be used to buy upgrades for the player character. Certain upgrades are required to complete the game. The game also features two multiplayer modes: "Tag", a cooperative mode where two players must work together to clear levels and collect Chaos Emeralds, and "Battle", a player versus player mode where two players race against each other.

Plot

Doctor Eggman kidnaps Princess Elise of Soleanna in the hopes of harnessing the Flames of Disaster, a destructive power sealed within her. Aided by his friends Tails and Knuckles, Sonic works to protect Elise from Eggman. Meanwhile, Shadow, his fellow agent Rouge, and Eggman accidentally release an evil spirit, Mephiles. The spirit transports the agent duo to a post-apocalyptic future ravaged by a demonic monster, Iblis. When Mephiles meets survivors Silver and Blaze, he fools them into thinking Sonic is the cause of the destruction and sends them to the present to kill him.

Throughout the story, Sonic and friends travel between the past, present, and future in their efforts to stop Mephiles and Iblis and protect Elise from Doctor Eggman. Though at first Silver stalks Sonic and impedes his attempts to save Elise, Shadow reveals to him that Sonic is not the cause of his world's suffering but rather Mephiles, who is trying to change the past for his own evil purposes. They travel 10 years in the past and learn that Mephiles seeks to bond with Iblis, who was sealed within Elise as a child, as they are the two halves of Soleanna's omnipotent god, Solaris. Mephiles eventually succeeds after killing Sonic to make Elise cry over his death, releasing her seal on Iblis and merging with him with the use of Chaos Emeralds to become Solaris, who then attempts to consume time itself. The heroes collect and use the power of the Chaos Emeralds to revive Sonic, and he, Shadow, and Silver transform into their super forms to defeat Solaris. Sonic and Elise are brought to the past and extinguish Solaris's flame, removing the god from existence and preventing the events from ever occurring. Despite this, Sonic and Elise show faint signs of recalling their encounter afterwards.

Development
After finishing Billy Hatcher and the Giant Egg (2003), Sonic Team began to plan its next project. Among the ideas the team was considering was a game with a realistic tone and an advanced physics engine. When Sega reassigned the team to start working on a new game in the bestselling Sonic series, they decided to retain the realistic approach. Sonic the Hedgehog was conceived for sixth-generation consoles, but Sonic Team realized its release would coincide with the series' 15th anniversary and decided to develop it for seventh-generation consoles such as the PlayStation 3 and Xbox 360. Series co-creator and team lead Yuji Naka wanted the first Sonic game for seventh-generation systems to reach a wide audience. Naka noted the success of superhero films such as Spider-Man 2 (2004) and Batman Begins (2005): "When Marvel or DC Comics turn their characters into films, they are thinking of them as blockbusters, huge hits, and that's what we were trying to emulate with Sonic." Thus, development of Sonic the Hedgehog began in late 2004. Sonic Team used the same title as the original 1991 Sonic the Hedgehog to indicate that it would be a major advance from the previous games and a reboot that returned to the series' roots.

The Havok physics engine, previously used in their PlayStation 2 game Astro Boy (2004), allowed Sonic Team to create expansive levels previously impossible on earlier sixth-generation consoles and experiment with multiple play-styles. In addition, the engine also enabled Sonic Team to experiment with aspects such as global illumination, a night-and-day system, and giving Sonic new abilities like using ropes to leap into the air. Director Shun Nakamura demonstrated the engine during their stage shows at the Tokyo Game Show (TGS) in 2005. As the hardware of the Xbox 360 and PlayStation 3 was more powerful compared to the prior generation's consoles, the design team was able to create a more realistic setting than those of previous Sonic games. Sonic and Doctor Eggman were redesigned to better suit this updated environment: Sonic was made taller, with longer quills, and Eggman was made slimmer and given a more realistic appearance. Nakamura and producer Masahiro Kumono reasoned this was because the characters would be interacting with more humans, and felt it would make the game more appealing to older players. At one point, Sonic Team considered giving Sonic realistic fur and rubber textures.

While Sonic Team had a major focus on the visuals, they considered their primary challenge creating a game that was as appealing as the original Sega Genesis Sonic games. They felt Sonic Heroes (2003) and Shadow the Hedgehog (2005) had veered into different directions and wanted to return the series to its speed-based roots in new ways. For example, they wanted to include multiple paths in levels, like the Genesis games had, a goal the realistic environments helped achieve. Sonic Team sought to "aggressively" address problems with the virtual camera system from earlier Sonic games, about which they had received many complaints.

Silver the Hedgehog's gameplay style was born out of Sonic Team's desire to take advantage of Havok's realistic physics capabilities. The first design concept for Silver's character was an orange mink; he attained his final hedgehog look after over 50 design iterations. In designing Shadow's gameplay, the developers abandoned the concept of firearms previously used in Shadow the Hedgehog (2005) in favor of combat elements to differentiate him from the other characters. Shadow's gameplay was further fleshed out with the addition of vehicles; each vehicle uses its own physical engine. The game also features several CGI cutscenes produced by Blur Studio. Animation supervisor Leo Santos said Blur faced challenges animating the opening scene due to the placement of Sonic's mouth.

As development progressed, Sonic Team faced serious problems. In March 2006, Naka resigned as head of Sonic Team to form his own company, Prope. Naka has said he resigned because he did not want to continue making Sonic games and instead wished to focus on original properties. With his departure, "the heart and soul of Sonic" was gone, according to former Sega of America CEO Tom Kalinske. Sonic the Hedgehog was originally intended for release on all major seventh-generation consoles as well as Windows, but Sega was presented with development kits for Nintendo's less powerful Wii console. Sega believed porting the game to Wii would take too long, and so conceived a Sonic game that would use the motion detection function of its controller.

Therefore, the team was split in two: Nakamura led one team to finish Sonic the Hedgehog for Xbox 360 and PlayStation 3 while producer Yojiro Ogawa led the other to begin work on Sonic and the Secret Rings for the Wii. The split left an unusually small team to work on Sonic the Hedgehog. Sega pressured the team to finish the game in time for the 2006 holiday shopping season, so with the deadline quickly approaching, Sonic Team rushed the final stages of development, ignoring bug reports from Sega's quality assurance department and control problems. In retrospect, Ogawa noted that the final period proved to be a large challenge for the team. Not only was the Xbox 360 release imminent, but the PlayStation 3 launch was scheduled not long afterwards. This put tremendous pressure on the team to develop for both systems. Producer Takashi Iizuka similarly recalled, "we didn't have any time to polish and we were just churning out content as quick as we could."

Audio
The cast of the Sonic X anime series reprised their voice roles for Sonic the Hedgehog, and actress Lacey Chabert supplied the voice of series newcomer and damsel in distress Princess Elise. The score for the game was primarily composed by Tomoya Ohtani along with Hideaki Kobayashi, Mariko Nanba, Taihei Sato, and Takahito Eguchi. It was the first Sonic game that Ohtani, who had previously contributed to Sonic Heroes and Shadow the Hedgehog, worked on as sound director. The main theme for the game, the fantasy-rap song "His World", was performed by Ali Tabatabaee and Matty Lewis of the band Zebrahead. Crush 40 performed Shadow's theme, "All Hail Shadow", while vocalist Bentley Jones (previously known as Lee Brotherton) sang Silver's theme, "Dreams of an Absolution". R&B artist Akon performed a remix of the Dreams Come True song "Sweet Sweet Sweet", a song previously used as the ending theme to Sonic the Hedgehog 2 (1992). Donna De Lory sang Elise's theme, "My Destiny".

Because Sonic the Hedgehog was the first Sonic game for seventh-generation consoles, Ohtani "aimed to emphasise that it was an epic next-generation title". Two soundtrack albums were released on January 10, 2007, under Sega's Wave Master label: Sonic the Hedgehog Vocal Traxx: Several Wills and Sonic the Hedgehog Original Soundtrack. Vocal Traxx: Several Wills contains seven songs; four are from the game, while the remaining three are remixes, including a version of "His World" performed by Crush 40. Original Soundtrack includes all 93 tracks featured in Sonic the Hedgehog, spanning three discs.

Release 
Sonic the Hedgehog was announced in a closed-doors presentation at the Electronic Entertainment Expo (E3) in May 2005. Later that year, at TGS in September, Naka revealed the game's title and said its release would correspond with the series' 15th anniversary. A demo version of the game was playable at E3 2006. A second demo, featuring a short section of Sonic's gameplay, was released via Xbox Live in September 2006. Sega released several packages of desktop wallpaper featuring characters from the game, and American publisher Prima Games published an official strategy guide, written by Fletcher Black. Sega also made a deal with Microsoft to run advertisements for the game in Windows Live Messenger.

The Xbox 360 version of Sonic the Hedgehog was released in North America on November 14, 2006, followed by a European release on November 24. Both versions were released in Japan on December 21. The PlayStation 3 version was released in North America on January 30, 2007, and in Europe on March 23. The game is often referred to by critics and fans with colloquial terms that reference its year of release, such as Sonic 2006 or Sonic 06.

In 2007, Sega released several packages of downloadable content that added features to single-player gameplay. These include a more difficult single-player mode and a continuous battle mode with all of the game's bosses back-to-back. One downloadable addition, "Team Attack Amigo" mode, sends players through a multitude of levels, changing to a different character every two or three levels and culminating in a boss fight. The PlayStation3 version was delayed to allow more time to incorporate the downloadable content, and thus launched alongside it.

The game was digitally rereleased via the Xbox Live Marketplace on April 15, 2010. The following October, various Sonic games with average or below average scores on the review aggregator website Metacritic, including Sonic the Hedgehog, were delisted from retailers. Sega reasoned this was to avoid confusing customers and increase the value of the brand, following positive prerelease responses to Sonic the Hedgehog 4: Episode I and Sonic Colors (both 2010). Sonic the Hedgehog was relisted on the Xbox 360 Marketplace in May 2022.

Reception

Sonic the Hedgehog was well-received during prerelease showings. Reception to prior games Sonic Heroes and Shadow the Hedgehog had been mixed; after a number of well-received showings and demos, some felt Sonic the Hedgehog could be a return to the series' roots. GameSpot said the game "showed a considerable amount of promise" after playing a demo at E3 2006, and GameSpy praised its graphics and environments. In 2008 GamesRadar said that it had looked "amazing" before its release.

At the time of release, the game received widespread negative reviews. Metacritic classified both versions' reception as "generally unfavorable". Sega reported that the game sold strongly, with 870,000 units sold in the United States and Europe within four months. The Xbox 360 version was branded under the Platinum Hits budget line.

Critics were divided on the game's presentation. IGN called its graphics and audio "decent" and felt its interface and menu system worked well but lacked polish, but GameSpot said the graphics, while colorful, were bland and only a small improvement over sixth-generation games, a sentiment echoed by 1UP.com. Game Informer and Eurogamer noted several graphical glitches. Eurogamer also criticized the decision to continue the Sonic Adventure style of gameplay, believing that Sonic Team had learned nothing from the criticisms of past games.

Reviewers singled out the game's camera system, loading times, controls, level designs, and glitches. GameSpot said the level design was worsened by the frustrating camera system, and Game Informer criticized the game's high difficulty, citing the camera as causing most deaths. Some reviewers were unhappy that the majority of the game was not spent playing as Sonic; playing as Tails, GameSpot wrote, made a level boring. Similar criticism was offered by Eurogamer, finding that the supporting cast annoyed rather than fleshing the game out; they considered the camera system to be the worst they had ever seen in a video game. On the positive side, 1UP felt that despite the control and level design problems, the game still played like a Sonic game.

The plot was criticized as confusing and inappropriately dark. GamesRadar considered it overwrought and "conceptually challenged", and Eurogamer found its voice acting painful and its cutscenes cringeworthy. Some reviewers unfavorably compared the story to that of an anime or Final Fantasy. The romance between Sonic and the human Princess Elise was especially criticized; for GamesTM, it marked the point "the [Sonic] series had veered off into absolute nonsense."

"This ... is a mess from top to bottom", wrote GameSpot, that "only the most blindly reverent Sonic the Hedgehog fan could possibly squeeze any enjoyment out of". IGN said that the game had some redeeming qualities, with brief segments of gameplay that demonstrated how a next-generation Sonic game could work, but found it "rips them away as soon as it shows them" and concluded that the game failed to reinvent the series. Eurogamer believed that Sonic the Hedgehogs mistakes would have been noticed even if the game had been released in 1996.

Despite the mostly negative reception, Game Informer and Dave Halverson of Play Magazine defended the game. Game Informer described it as ambitious and praised the graphics, story, amount of content, and replay value, but believed only Sonic fans would enjoy the game. Halverson initially gave the Xbox360 version a 9.5/10, praising each character's controls and abilities and calling it the best 3D Sonic game yet. In the following issue, Halverson reassessed it as 8.5/10, writing that he had been told that the load times and glitches in his review copy would not be in the final version of the game. In a later review of the PlayStation3 version, Halverson was frustrated that the problems had still not been corrected and that the performance was worse despite the extra development time; Halverson gave this version a 5.5/10. The A.V. Club said in 2016 that despite the game's poor quality, the soundtrack has some "genuine rippers".

Legacy 
GameTrailers and GamesRadar considered Sonic the Hedgehog one of the most disappointing games of 2006. GamesTM singled out the game when it ranked the Sonic franchise at the top of their list of "Video Game Franchises That Lost Their Way". The A.V. Club, Kotaku, Game Informer, and USgamer called the game the worst in the Sonic series, and the staff of GamesRadar named it among the worst video games of all time. The game remains popular for "Let's Play" walkthroughs, with players showing off its glitches. In 2019, a video gained popularity in which a group of voice actors dub over the game's cutscenes in a single take, creating a nonsensical, improvisational storyline about video game culture. The official Sonic Twitter account also mocks the game. The failure of Sonic the Hedgehog led to the direction of the series being rethought. The next main Sonic game, 2008's Unleashed, ignored the gritty and realistic tone of its predecessor. With Unleashed's sequel Sonic Colors, The A.V. Club wrote that "the series rediscovered its strength for whimsical tales with light tones."

Sonic the Hedgehog introduced Silver the Hedgehog, Princess Elise, Mephiles, and Iblis to the franchise; most have made few appearances since. Silver is a playable character in Sonic Rivals (2006) and its sequel, in Sonic Riders: Zero Gravity (2008), and in Mario & Sonic at the Olympic Winter Games and its sequels, and is a minor character in the Nintendo DS version of Sonic Colors (2010) and Sonic Forces (2017). He also appeared in the Sonic the Hedgehog comic book series published by Archie Comics. The main theme of Sonic the Hedgehog and the theme of Sonic, "His World", was sampled in Drake's 2017 song "KMT".

To celebrate the Sonic franchise's 20th anniversary in 2011, Sega released Sonic Generations, which remade aspects of past Sonic games. The PlayStation 3, Xbox 360, and Windows versions feature a remake of Sonic the Hedgehogs "Crisis City" level, and every version, including the Nintendo 3DS version, includes a reimagined version of the boss battle with Silver. The decision to include Sonic the Hedgehog stages and bosses in Sonic Generations was criticized by critics and fans of the series; Jim Sterling of Destructoid referred to the Silver boss fight as the "catch" of the otherwise high-quality game.

In 2015, a fan group, Gistix, began developing a remake for Windows using the Unity engine. A demo was released in January 2017, and was positively received by journalists. A second demo was released in late 2017, which Eurogamer called ambitious. A second team of fans, led by ChaosX, began developing a separate PC remake in Unity, Sonic P-06, releasing multiple demos from 2019 onward.

Notes

References

External links

  
 Sonic the Hedgehog (2006 game) on Sonic Retro, for character stats and additional plot details
 Sonic the Hedgehog (2006) on MobyGames

Sonic the Hedgehog video games
2006 video games
3D platform games
Multiplayer and single-player video games
Cooperative video games
Video game reboots
Sega video games
PlayStation 3 games
Xbox 360 games
Sonic Team games
Action-adventure games
Apocalyptic video games
Post-apocalyptic video games
Cancelled Wii games
Cancelled Windows games
Genocide in fiction
Video games set in Venice
Video games about size change
Video games about time travel
Video games scored by Tomoya Ohtani
Video games scored by Takahito Eguchi
Video games scored by Mariko Nanba
Video games scored by Hideaki Kobayashi
Video games using Havok
Video games developed in Japan